Stella Marian Minter Mitchell (born 21 July 1947) is a British former swimmer. Mitchell competed in two events at the 1964 Summer Olympics. At the ASA National British Championships she won the 220 yards breaststroke title four times in 1963, 1964, 1965 and 1966.

References

External links

1947 births
Living people
British female swimmers
Olympic swimmers of Great Britain
Swimmers at the 1964 Summer Olympics
People from Hendon
Sportspeople from London
Commonwealth Games medallists in swimming
Commonwealth Games silver medallists for England
Swimmers at the 1966 British Empire and Commonwealth Games
20th-century British women
Medallists at the 1966 British Empire and Commonwealth Games